The men's triple jump event  at the 1998 European Athletics Indoor Championships was held on 28 February–1 March.

Medalists

Results

Qualification
Qualification performance: 16.90 (Q) or at least 12 best performers (q) advanced to the final.

Final

References

Qualification results
Final results

Triple jump at the European Athletics Indoor Championships
Triple